Olympique de Marseille almost won the French League for the first time in 11 years, having a remarkable run to third place, having only scored five goals more than it conceded. The most praised player was central defender Daniel Van Buyten, who was able to tighten up the defence, and also helping out with scoring several important goals. Without Marseille's goalscoring woes, it could have sustained a more serious title assault. Therefore it signed late-blooming starlet Didier Drogba from En Avant Guingamp, a move that was set to be among the best financial deals in the clubs' history.

Squad

Goalkeepers
  Vedran Runje
  Cédric Carrasso

Defenders
  Jérôme Perez
  Manuel dos Santos
  Daniel Van Buyten
  Eduardo Tuzzio
  Sébastien Pérez
  Abdoulaye Méïté
  Franck Leboeuf
  Johnny Ecker
  Fabien Laurenti
  Loris Reina

Midfielders
  Fabien Camus
  Brahim Hemdani
  Piotr Świerczewski
  Pascal Johansen
  Delfim
  Djamel Belmadi
  Salomon Olembé
  Mickaël Marsiglia
  Benjamin Gavanon
  Michel Gafour
  Fabio Celestini
  Karim Dahou

Attackers
  Fernandão
  Ibrahima Bakayoko
  Cyril Chapuis
  Lamine Sakho
  Dmitri Sychev
  Laurent Merlin

Competitions

Ligue 1

League table

Results summary

Results by round

Matches

Top Scorers
  Ibrahima Bakayoko 9 (1)
  Daniel Van Buyten 8
  Cyril Chapuis 4
  Lamine Sakho 4 (1)
  Fernandão 4
  Dmitri Sychev 3

Sources
RSSSF - France 2002/03

Olympique de Marseille seasons
Marseille